The UNESCO (United Nations Educational, Scientific and Cultural Organization) has designated 99 World Heritage Sites in 5 countries (also called "state parties") of East Asia: China, Mongolia, North Korea, South Korea and Japan.

In this region, China is home to the most inscribed sites with number of 55. The first sites from the region (and only sites designated in the 1980s or before) were the Great Wall of China, Mount Tai, the Peking Man Site at Zhoukoudian, Imperial Palace of the Ming and Qing Dynasties, the Mogao Caves and the Mausoleum of the First Qin Emperor, and all of them were in China. Each year, UNESCO's World Heritage Committee may inscribe new sites on the list, or delist sites that no longer meet the criteria. Selection is based on ten criteria: six for cultural heritage (i–vi) and four for natural heritage (vii–x). Some sites, designated "mixed sites," represent both cultural and natural heritage. In Eastern Asia, there are 74 cultural, 21 natural, and four mixed sites.

The World Heritage Committee may also specify that a site is endangered, citing "conditions which threaten the very characteristics for which a property was inscribed on the World Heritage List." In this region there are no sites currently listed as endangered, nor have been listed previously. Possible danger listing has been considered by UNESCO in a number of other cases.

Although a number of sites in Taiwan have been proposed, interference from PRC has prevented any site on the island from being listed.

Legend

Site; named after the World Heritage Committee's official designation
Location; at city, regional, or provincial level and geocoordinates
Criteria; as defined by the World Heritage Committee
Area; in hectares and acres. If available, the size of the buffer zone has been noted as well. A value of zero implies that no data has been published by UNESCO
Year; during which the site was inscribed to the World Heritage List
Description; brief information about the site, including reasons for qualifying as an endangered site, if applicable

World Heritage Sites

Performance of East Asia in UNESCO
The performance of Southeast Asia is contrasted by the performance of South and East Asia. Eastern Asian countries are noted with 'EA'.

Notes

References

Asia